Julius Eichberg (13 June 1824 – 19 January 1893) was a German-born composer, musical director and educator who worked mostly in Boston, Massachusetts.

Biography
Julius Eichberg was born in Düsseldorf, Germany to a Jewish family. His first musical instruction came from his father whose pupil was an acceptable violin player by his seventh year. He also received instruction outside the family. He attended the Musical Academy of Würzburg as a child. Upon the recommendation of Felix Mendelssohn, he entered the Brussels Conservatoire at the age of nineteen, where he took first prizes for violin playing and composition. He was a pupil of Belgian composer Charles Auguste de Bériot, studied composition under François-Joseph Fétis, and studied violin under Lambert Joseph Meerts. For eleven years he occupied the post of professor in the Conservatoire of Geneva.

In 1857, he came to the United States, staying two years in New York City and then proceeding to Boston, where he became the chef d'orchestre at the Boston Museum. In 1867 he founded and directed the Boston Conservatory of Music, and in the same year he was elected superintendent of music in the Boston Public Schools, which position he long held. He also founded the Eichberg Violin School. He later composed symphonies and piano pieces. Julius Eichberg died in Boston on January 19, 1893; his obituary gives January 18. He was interred at Mount Auburn cemetery, the first burial there of an identifiable Jew.

Family
He married Sophie Mertens, and they had one child, Annie Philippine Eichberg, who was born in Geneva, Switzerland, c. 1856. Annie married twice, first to Tyler Batcheller King on 26 February 1884, and following his death to the English publisher John Lane on 13 August 1898. Annie Eichberg Lane was author of To Thee, O Country (national hymn) and of the books Brown's Retreat, Kitwyk, The Champagne Standard, Talk of the Town and According to Maria. She died in London.

Works
Eichberg published several educational works on music. As a composer he is particularly known for his three operettas, The Rose of Tyrol (1865), The Two Cadis (1868) and A Night in Rome, and with Benjamin Edward Woolf the opera The Doctor of Alcantara (1862).

Notes

References

External links
 

1824 births
1893 deaths
19th-century classical composers
19th-century German composers
19th-century American composers
19th-century American male musicians
American Romantic composers
American opera composers
American male classical composers
Classical musicians from Massachusetts
German male classical composers
German opera composers
German Romantic composers
Jewish American classical composers
Jewish classical composers
Jewish opera composers
Male opera composers
Musicians from Boston